Abdullah Baybaşin was a drug dealer in Britain. He had been accused in 2004 and convicted of drug charges in 2006 for trafficking  of heroin, and sentenced to 22 years in prison.

The British Court of Appeal ordered a retrial on the drugs charge in 2010 after determining that the judge’s summing up of the evidence at the trial was unfair. At retrial on 22 October 2010, a judge at London's Woolwich Crown Court ordered the jury to find Baybasin not guilty because the lack of prosecution evidence meant a conviction would be unsupported. Judge Charles Byers said that there was no direct evidence and very little circumstantial evidence of Baybasin's involvement in a conspiracy to supply 5 lb (2.3 kg) of heroin.

Baybaşin's family claimed he was wrongly accused by the British Police. They alleged that he was convicted at the first trial despite a lack of evidence, except for the statement of a convicted felon that turned out to be untruthful. It was also claimed that the British press declared him guilty on the basis of hearsay without carrying out any kind of investigation.

On 8 November 2010, Baybasin was awarded £20,000 in damages by the Prison Services. The Ministry of Justice has accepted that Baybasin, who uses a wheelchair, suffered from degrading treatment and discrimination on account of his disability while he was in Belmarsh jail in London. On hearing the decision of the Ministry, Baybaşin said that "The treatment I received at HMP Belmarsh was very degrading, and at times I struggled to cope. I thought I would die in prison, and often thought things would never get better."

References

External links 
 Summers, Chris.  "The rise and fall of a drugs empire", BBC News.  April 7, 2006.

Living people
Year of birth missing (living people)
People from Lice, Turkey
Turkish people of Kurdish descent
Turkish emigrants to the United Kingdom
Turkish expatriates in the United Kingdom
Turkish drug traffickers
Turkish crime bosses